Sinners is a 2007 film, based on true story and written and directed by Tory Christopher. Eleven Eleven Pictures produced the feature. The film stars Ben Kurland, Matthew Christopher, and Sean Hoagland.

Plot
Brother Jim Jefferies leads the "Congregation of the Cross" in the small West Texas town of Britten. To be sure his children never falter, Brother Jim relentlessly reminds his congregation of the dire consequences, should one stray from the Lord's word. Temptation, however, can be great, and when sin is in the heart, a young man finds himself damned for all eternity, thus leading himself, his best friend, and his friend's brother, on a cross-country journey to avenge God's will. Arriving in Los Angeles, they meet a cunning con-man. Together, the four young men find themselves in the middle of dangerous street games that finally lead them to perpetrate the ultimate sin; or had the sin already been committed?

Awards
Best Film, Swansea Bay Film Festival 2007

External links

2007 films
2007 drama films
American drama films
2000s English-language films
2000s American films
English-language drama films